General Brereton may refer to:

Lewis H. Brereton (1890–1967), United States Army lieutenant general
Paul Brereton (born 1957), Australian Army Reserve major general
Sir William Brereton, 1st Baronet (1604–1661), English Parliamentarian army general
William Brereton (British Army officer) (1789–1864), British Army lieutenant general

See also
Brereton (surname)